The 1958 United States Senate election in Virginia was held on November 4, 1958. Incumbent Senator Harry F. Byrd, Sr. was re-elected to a sixth term after defeating Independent Louise Wensel and Social Democrat Clarke Robb.

Results

See also 
 1958 United States Senate elections

References

Virginia
1958
United States Senate